Habroteleia spinosa, is a species of wasp belonging to the family Platygastridae. It is described from Papua New Guinea and Indonesia.

Etymology
The specific name spinosa is due to pointed apex of T6 in females.

Description
Male is larger than female. Body length of female is about 3.51–3.52 mm, whereas male is 3.37–3.81 mm. Mesosoma and metasoma are black. Antennae scrobe is punctate rugose. Central keel present.

References

Insects described in 2018
Scelioninae